AFL Quebec is a 9-a-side Australian football competition formerly known as the Eastern Canadian Australian Football League or ECAFL. The league has both a men's and women's division and consists of teams from Montréal and its surrounding areas. Players from the current regular season teams are eligible to play representative 18-a-side football for the men's team the Québec Saints or the women's team the Montréal Angels. The Saints and Angels participate in the United States AFL National Championships Tournament, the Saints having previously participated in the AFL Ontario Division 2 competition from 2008–10.

History

Formation Years: 2008-2010
The creation of the Québec Saints in early 2008 and their participation in the Toronto-based 'Rec' Footy league that same year led to a growing interest in Australian Football in Montréal. To capitalise on the popularity, club founder Luke Anderson launched a locally based 9-a-side competition named the Eastern Canadian Australian Football League or ECAFL. The 9-a-side format of the game is played on reduced size fields (usually rugby or soccer fields). Players from the Québec Saints were drafted into two subsidiary teams, the first match of the newly formed league was played on 4 October 2008 between the Montréal Saints and Laval Bombers at Parc Cartier in Laval. 

2009 saw the league schedule seven regular season games and one final and launch the introduction of an invitational Pre-Season tournament. The league also introduced women's football for the first time. The newly formed Montréal Angels (a branch of the Québec Saints), played exhibition games against the Toronto Central Blues and Montréal Shamrocks Gaelic Football team. Players from the 9-a-side competition where eligible to play representative football for the Québec Saints who were competing in the Ontario AFL Division 2.   

With increasing player numbers, the 2010 season saw the launch of a third Montréal based team, the Pointe Claire Power. The invitational pre-season cup was contested by a record six teams and for the first time included a women's division. The league established a home field at Parc Cluny in Laval. The season was reduced to five rounds to accommodate the Québec Saints Ontario AFL schedule, the representative 18-a-side team's fixture featuring a marked increase in games in Ottawa and Toronto.

Transition Year: 2011
Club and league founder Luke Anderson departed Montréal in late 2010 and the newly formed committee under the leadership of new president Renaud Carbonell made several changes to the league's structure. Major changes included the Québec Saints withdrawing from the Ontario AFL's Division 2 competition and AFL Québec returning to the original two teams with the folding of the 2010 premiers the Pointe Claire Power. While player participation experienced a drop-off in 2011, Montréal still had a significant football presence with a host of players and coaches participating in 'IC11', the International Cup of Australian Football co-hosted by Melbourne and Sydney, Australia.

Expansion Era: 2012-17
2012 saw a resurgence of Australian Football under the leadership of new president Neil Koch. The league was rebranded 'AFL Quebec', expanded to four teams - three of which had official backing from AFL teams the Melbourne Demons, Fremantle Dockers and West Coast Eagles - and Montreal would be represented at the U.S Nationals football tournament for the first time, albeit as a combine team. The growing interest in Aussie Rules would continue for the next few years before the league officially announced the creation of a women's division for 2014 with the creation of the N.D.G. Giants and Plateau Eagles.

In 2015 the women's league expanded to four teams when Ottawa entered the Carleton Warriors and the Rideau Shamrocks into the competition.

AFL Quebec Premiers

AFL Quebec Individual Awards

Current and Former AFL Quebec Teams

Men's Teams

Women's Teams

References 
Anderson, Luke.A. L'Histoire des bleus et blancs: An Aussie Rules Journey Through Canada. Blurb Publishing, 2011.

External links 

Sports leagues in Quebec
Australian rules football leagues in Canada